Kuragama Grama Niladhari Division is a Grama Niladhari Division of the Thumpane Divisional Secretariat of Kandy District of Central Province, Sri Lanka. It has Grama Niladhari Division Code 365.

Pelenegama, Pohaliyadda, Girantalawa and Poholiadda are located within, nearby or associated with Kuragama.

Kuragama is a surrounded by the Kuragama North, Paranagama, Pavulpawa, Poholiyadda, Hiyadala and Wettewa Grama Niladhari Divisions.

Demographics

Ethnicity 
The Kuragama Grama Niladhari Division has a Sinhalese majority (99.8%). In comparison, the Thumpane Divisional Secretariat (which contains the Kuragama Grama Niladhari Division) has a Sinhalese majority (92.3%)

Religion 
The Kuragama Grama Niladhari Division has a Buddhist majority (99.5%). In comparison, the Thumpane Divisional Secretariat (which contains the Kuragama Grama Niladhari Division) has a Buddhist majority (91.8%)

References 

Grama Niladhari Divisions of Thumpane Divisional Secretariat
Geography of Kandy District